Ambohimena is a rural municipality in northern Madagascar. It belongs to the district of Ambanja, which is a part of Diana Region.

References 

Populated places in Diana Region